Seaford High School is a public high school located in Seaford, New York, United States serving students in the ninth through twelfth grades. It is in the Seaford Union Free School District.

As of the 201415 school year, the school had an enrollment of 756 students and 61.6 classroom teachers (on an FTE basis), for a student–teacher ratio of 12.3:1. There were 43 students (5.7% of enrollment) eligible for free lunch and 22 (2.9% of students) eligible for reduced-cost lunch.

General
The high school building was constructed in 1956.  On November 22, 2002, a memorial was dedicated to five alumni and other victims of the September 11 terrorist attacks.

Students are able to take classes in a variety of subjects (including advanced placement courses) and participate in a number of sports.

Notable alumni

 Brent Budowsky newspaper columnist
 Liberty DeVitto - 1971, drummer for Billy Joel
 Courtney Henggeler - 1997, actress, Cobra Kai 
 Matthew Koma 2005 - musician 
 Susan Miller - 1965, Playboy Playmate, model
 Sean Nolin - Minor League Baseball pitcher
 Jim Norris - Major League Baseball outfielder
 Pete Koegel - Major League Baseball player
 Jim Valvano - 1963, NCAA basketball coach, North Carolina State University

References

External links
 

Public high schools in New York (state)
Educational institutions established in 1956
Hempstead, New York
Schools in Nassau County, New York
1956 establishments in New York (state)